Cevat Çobanlı (14 September 1870 or 1871 – 13 March 1938) was a military commander of the Ottoman Army, War Minister (Harbiye Nazırı) of the Ottoman Empire and a general of the Turkish Army who was notable for causing major Naval losses to the Allies during their Dardanelles campaign in World War I.

Family

Cevat was born on 14 September 1870 or in 1871 in Sultanahmet (Istanbul, Ottoman Empire) His mother was Emine Hanım and his father was Müşir Şakir Pasha, Chief of Staff of the Ottoman Army. His family is originally from Malatya.

Education and Military Career

After graduating from the Galatasaray High School, he enrolled in the Ottoman Military Academy (Mekteb-i Fünûn-u Harbiyye-i Şâhâne) in 1888. He graduated from the school as the fourth of his class in 1891 and joined the Ottoman military as an Infantry Second Lieutenant (Mülâzım-ı Sani). He continued his education in the Ottoman Military College (Mekteb-i Erkân-ı Harbiye-i Şâhâne). In 1892, he was promoted to the rank of First Lieutenant (Mülâzım-ı Evvel). In 1894, he graduated from the military college as a Staff Captain (Erkân-ı Harp Yüzbaşısı) and began his service in the General Staff of the Palace (Maiyet-i Seniyye Erkân-ı Harbiyesi) as an aide-de-camp of Sultan.

He was promoted to the rank of Colonel in 1900 and one-star general in 1901. He was put in charge of improving the defences of Edirne after some deployments abroad. He became a two-star general in 1906. In 1909, as a result of reorganization of military ranks (Tasfiye-i Rütbe Kanunu) he was demoted by two ranks.

Balkan Wars

He was the chief of staff of the artillery of the Çatalca Army when the Second Balkan War broke out in 1913. He was appointed as the inspector at the Bulgarian border. He received a medal of merit due to his excellent service.

World War I

He was appointed as the Commander of the Çanakkale Fortified Area on November 29, 1914. He is considered as a hero for causing immense casualties to the Allied forces during the Dardanelles Campaign. He was appointed as the commander of the 14th Army towards the end of 1915 and was involved in the trench warfare that dominated the last phase of that conflict. After the successful defense of Galipoli and defeat of the Allies, he was appointed as the Group Commander of the region. He served in the Battle of Galicia as Commander of the 15th Army also. At the end of the war, he was serving at the Palestine front.

Exile in Malta

After the occupation of Constantinople by Allied forces, he was arrested by the British in March of 1920 and exiled to Malta. After he was released, he returned to Turkey in 1922 and joined Mustafa Kemal Atatürk in the Turkish War of Independence. He commanded Ecezire front. For his services in the war, he earned the  Medal of Independence.

Republic Period

He was elected to the parliament in 1923 from Elazığ while he was still part of the military. He represented Turkey during the 1925 international negotiations regarding Mosul. He eventually retired in 1934 due to age limit.

Later Life

After his retirement, he lived in his mansion at Göztepe. He died on March 13, 1938. He was laid to rest in Sahrayı Cedit Cemetery, in 1988, he was moved to the Ankara State Cemetery. 

Author Cevat Şakir Kabaağaçlı and the painters Aliye Berger and Fahrelnissa Zeid were his nephew and nieces.

Medals and decorations
Order of the Medjidieh 1st Class with Sword
Gold Medal of Liyakat
Gold Medal of Imtiyaz
Bulgaria Order of Military Merit (Bulgaria)
Bulgaria Order of St Alexander 2nd Class
Spain Order of Isabella the Catholic 2nd Class
Prussia Order of the Crown (Prussia) 2nd Class
Prussia Iron Cross 1st and 2nd Class
Prussia Order of the Red Eagle
Bavaria Military Merit Order (Bavaria) 2nd Class with Sword
Bavaria Merit Order of the Bavarian Crown 1st Class with Sword
Austria-Hungary Military Merit Medal (Austria-Hungary) 2nd Class
Austria-Hungary Red Cross 1st Class
Austria-Hungary Order of the Iron Crown (Austria) 1st Class
Austria-Hungary Order of the Iron Crown 2nd Class Military
Medal of Independence with Red Ribbon & Citation

Sources

See also
 List of high-ranking commanders of the Turkish War of Independence
 

1870 births
1938 deaths
Military personnel from Istanbul
Ottoman Army generals
Turkish Army generals
Ottoman Military Academy alumni
Ottoman Military College alumni
Ottoman military personnel of the Italo-Turkish War
Ottoman military personnel of the Balkan Wars
Ottoman military personnel of World War I
Malta exiles
Turkish military personnel of the Turkish War of Independence
Turkish military personnel of the Greco-Turkish War (1919–1922)
Recipients of the Order of the Medjidie, 1st class
Recipients of the Liakat Medal
Recipients of the Imtiyaz Medal
Recipients of the Order of Military Merit (Bulgaria)
Recipients of the Order of Isabella the Catholic
Recipients of the Iron Cross (1914), 1st class
Recipients of the Medal of Independence with Red Ribbon (Turkey)
Burials at Turkish State Cemetery